Gaël Andonian (born 7 February 1995) is a professional footballer who plays as a centre-back for Championnat National 3 club Marseille Endoume. Born in France, he is a former Armenia international.

He began his career with hometown club Marseille, making one substitute appearance in Ligue 1 and playing mostly for the reserves.

Andonian was born in France and represented the country at under-16 level in 2011. In 2015, he debuted at senior level for Armenia, his ancestral country.

Club career
Born in Marseille, Andonian is a youth exponent from hometown club Marseille. He was first called into a matchday squad for their 1–0 win away at Nancy on 16 September 2012, remaining an unused substitute. His only other call-up that season was on 6 December, again unused as Marseille lost 3–0 away to AEL Limassol in the UEFA Europa League, both teams already eliminated.

He made his professional debut in a 2–1 Ligue 1 home win against Lens on 2 November 2014, replacing Florian Thauvin for the last 10 minutes.

On 21 October 2015, having taken no part in Marseille's season, Andonian was loaned to Ligue 2 club Dijon for the remainder of the season. He made six appearances in Ligue 2 as the team from Burgundy won promotion, scoring his first professional goal as a last-minute equaliser in a 2–2 draw at Niort on 8 January 2016, and contributing to the own goal that was their other strike in the game. Additionally, Andonian made two appearances in the Coupe de la Ligue, and two appearances in the Coupe de France.

On 27 January 2017, Andonian was loaned to Superleague Greece club Veria for the remainder of the season.  He made 10 appearances for Veria, and was sent off on 12 March in a 1–0 loss at Platanias.

In September 2018 following his release from Marseille, Andonian had a spell on trial at EFL League One side Sunderland, and played an under-23 match against West Bromwich Albion. Manager Jack Ross did not sign him due to wage issues, as the club were involved in protracted situations regarding Papy Djilobodji and Didier Ndong.

On 18 July 2019, Andonian signed a one-year contract with Ajaccio of Ligue 2. He was an unused substitute eight days later in a 2–2 home draw against Le Havre. Hampered by a shoulder injury, he took no part in the rest of the season and his contract was terminated at its midway point.

Andonian signed for Martigues of the Championnat National 2 on 1 February 2020. That September, he signed for Aubagne of the same league.

International career
In 2011, Andonian played two friendlies for France under-16, both goalless draws against Slovenia on 5 and 7 April.

On 26 February 2015, the president of the Armenian Football Federation Ruben Hayrapetyan announced that Andonian would arrive in the Armenian capital Yerevan on 21 March to receive Armenian citizenship and officially join the Armenia national football team.

Eight days later he received his first international cap, playing the full 90 minutes against Albania in a 2–1 defeat at the Elbasan Arena in UEFA Euro 2016 qualifying.

Career statistics

Club

International

References

External links
 
 

1995 births
Living people
Armenian footballers
Armenia international footballers
French footballers
France youth international footballers
Footballers from Marseille
Association football defenders
Ligue 1 players
Ligue 2 players
Championnat National 2 players
Championnat National 3 players
Super League Greece players
Olympique de Marseille players
Dijon FCO players
Veria F.C. players
AC Ajaccio players
FC Martigues players
French expatriate footballers
Armenian expatriate footballers
Expatriate footballers in Greece
French expatriate sportspeople in Greece
Armenian expatriate sportspeople in Greece
French people of Armenian descent
Citizens of Armenia through descent
Aubagne FC players